The Namp'ohang Line, or Namp'o Port Line, is an electrified secondary railway line of the Korean State Railway in Namp'o Special City, North Korea, from Sinnamp'o on the P'yŏngnam Line to Namp'ohang.

History
The line was opened by the Korean State Railway after the end of the Korean War to serve glass factories and shipbuilders located in the area.

Services
This line serves Namp'o Port, where the Namp'o Shipyard is located; the shipyard builds marine vessels of various sizes. Steel and other products are received by rail. Also located on this line is the Namp'o Glass Bottle Factory, a petroleum storage tank farm, the Ch'ŏnji Lubricant Factory, and the Pyeonghwa Motors factory.

Route 

A yellow background in the "Distance" box indicates that section of the line is not electrified.

References

Railway lines in North Korea
Standard gauge railways in North Korea